The 1990 Stella Artois Indoor (known as such in 1990 for sponsorship reasons) was a men's tennis tournament played on indoor carpet courts. It was the 13th edition of the tournament, and was part of the ATP World Series of the 1990 ATP Tour. It took place at the Palatrussardi in Milan, Italy, from 5 February until 11 February 1990. First-seeded Ivan Lendl won the singles title, his third at the event after 1983 and 1986.

Finals

Singles

 Ivan Lendl defeated  Tim Mayotte, 6–3, 6–2
 It was Lendl's 2nd singles title of the year and the 85th of his career.

Doubles

 Omar Camporese /  Diego Nargiso defeated  Tom Nijssen /  Udo Riglewski, 6–4, 6–4
It was Camporese's first doubles title of the year, and of his career.
It was Nargiso's first doubles title of the year, and of his career.

References

External links
 ITF tournament edition details

 
Milan Indoor
Milan Indoor
Milan Indoor